Shuttle–UM is a transit system for the University of Maryland, College Park (UMD), which constitutes the UM acronym of the company, that operates as a unit of the university's Department of Transportation Services. The system is student-run and is supported by student fees and the university's Student Affairs department. Its fleet consists of over 60 vehicles and transports approximately three million rides a year. The system provides four different services: commuter, evening, charter, and demand response. The latter consists of a paratransit service and a call response curb-to-curb service during the evening, while the former consists of a bus service that runs for 24 hours, seven days a week. Implied by its name, the bus service routes "shuttle" passengers to and from the university with over 20 different routes. Paid upon admission by students to the university, the services are complimentary and only certain services require university identification badges. 
In 2012, the company expanded to provide service to the University of Maryland, Baltimore (UMB) campus under the name, UM Shuttle. Additionally, a new facility was built to house Shuttle–UM's operations and fleet within the campus after over 30 years of being housed off campus.

History

1970s–2000s
Shuttle–UM was established in November 1972 by the University of Maryland, College Park's (UMD) Black Student Union as an initiative to promote security for students walking through campus during the evening hours. Operations began with the use of two vans to circulate campus, which were purchased by UMD's Student Government Association (SGA), the campus' student governing body, through approval by the Office of Commuter Student Affairs, a campus organization supporting students commuters. The operations were run in the basement of a residence hall on campus and consisted of running the vans on two fixed routes. By Spring 1973, the Residence Hall Association, the governing body for the campus' dormitory halls, donated an additional van which led to three fixed routes running through campus in the evening. By the end of the system's first year of service, 65,000 had been transported. The following year saw the addition of daytime routes to operations to parking lots and the establishment of Call-A-Ride, which was the original first curb-to-curb service for the transit system. In 1975, four Mercedes Benz vans were purchased to expand the fleet to six vehicles. This same year, the name Shuttle-UM was established, three years after being a service provided by SGA, Shuttle–UM was now an independent entity for UMD. Upon the transit system's independence, Charter service was added to its operations in 1975; the following year saw expansion to the curb-to-curb service with Disability Transit Service" for handicap persons; off-campus routes were established in 1976.

During the fall of 1978, Shuttle–UM's first facility was built on an off-campus parking lot on Greenhouse Road adjacent to Baltimore Avenue. The new facility, known as UMD Building 013, featured a 12,000 gallon underground diesel tank, numerous maintenance bays, and a bus wash bay. Upon 1979, the project that started as a security service expanded to a transit system consisting of 10 routes with over 20 vehicles. Barri Standish was hired as the first non-student full-time staff member to serve as the General Manager for Shuttle–UM to provide student guidance in transit operations. Through 1985 and 1988, the Greenhouse facility was expanded to allocate growing operations with administrative offices and maintenance bays. Shuttle–UM's expansion in 1985 also composed of ridership growing to 1.1 million passengers annually and employing 125 student employees that took the positions of "drivers, dispatchers, maintenance assistance, trainers, and managers." By 1986, Shuttle–UM became a member of the American Public Transportation Association and the Transit Association of Maryland. Within 1999 and 2001, the facility's maintenance bays were expanded to accommodate the growing fleet caused by the growing ridership; the administrative offices also underwent a further expansion in 2001 to accommodate growing employment.

2010s–
For several years, the annual ridership remained above 2 million; however, during the 2011–12 academic year, DOTS started an initiative that would reward their three millionth rider with free books for a school year, which ultimately commenced in their first year with 3 million riders. In 2012, the construction of a brand new facility was completed on Paint Branch Drive within campus adjacent to the XFINITY Center. This new facility fit into DOTS' mission and goal to be more sustainable.    The facility included geo-thermal heating and cooling systems, a green roof, and an in-ground filtration system to separate run-off diesel and storm water in the fueling area. The new facility was able to house all administration that was expanded within the years at the Greenhouse facility and featured an above-ground diesel tank that stored 2,000 gallons more.

Shuttle–UM saw its first expansion with the introduction of its UM Shuttle service for the University of Maryland, Baltimore campus which strictly serves the surrounding Baltimore areas near campus. President Jay Perman reached an agreement with UMD to answer requests of the UMB community to obtain a shuttle service within campus. In August 2012, UM Shuttle officially launched and began to transport staff, faculty, and other members of the UMB community with three distinct routes. The vehicles for these routes are operated in Baltimore but housed in the Paint Branch facility and driven by UMD employees. Like Shuttle–UM, university ID's grant access to riding the shuttles for UMB.

 Fares 
Shuttle–UM and UM Shuttle are complimentary services via paid student fees and UMD's Student Affairs' funds. Additionally, living complexes and businesses pay the organization to run the service in their area, which allow riders to ride by just showing drivers a university ID, not limited to University of Maryland System schools. Residents of College Park were granted access to Shuttle–UM's services via a program approved by city council in 2010, which granted residents passes to show drivers. In September 2012, the city of Greenbelt passed a similar program to that of College Park allowing passes for its residents to use Shuttle–UM's services.

Structure
Shuttle–UM, although as separate entity in the beginning, is now a branch of DOTS, along with Campus Parking Enforcement. Both are housed at the Paint Branch facility; however, customer inquires regarding parking operate out of Regents Drive Garage offices. Located at Regents Drive Garage are the directors of DOTS, which is overseen by Senior Director David Allen: the directors delegate planning and oversee activity of every branch of the corporation. Every driving staff member for Shuttle–UM that holds a Commercial Driver's License (CDL) is assigned a unit number, which are uniquely grouped to identify different departments and status'. These unit numbers are used to eliminate the usage of full names while having radio contact and have an important role in operations for the company.

Management
The Shuttle–UM and Campus Parking Enforcement operations branches of DOTS are overseen by its Senior Associate Director, Armand Scala, who directly reports to Allen. The two chief executives are regarded as being at the top realm of company operations, who work directly with numerous full-time chief operatives. Under the executives are the full-time shift supervisors, who directly manage the full-time driving staff. Student managers have the responsibility of managing student driving staff, alongside being responsible for running several departments of the organization's operations, such as Dispatch and Demand Response.

Driving Staff
The drivers for Shuttle-UM are all required to have a CDL class B, with passenger and air-brakes endorsement. These requirements are to be met in order to operate the vehicles in Shuttle-UM's fleet. Although completely composed of student drivers upon the company's inception, as of 2013, staff now features non-student full-time and part-time drivers. The full-time driving staff have a set schedule package that they select before every academic semester (Fall, Winter, Spring, and Summer) for UMCP consisting of 40 hours. Students are required to be enrolled at UMCP or University of Maryland Global Campus, the latter due to the sister school sharing the UMCP campus, in order to be eligible to go through CDL training with Shuttle-UM. Students are given the opportunity to obtain their CDL granted upon that they complete a semester's worth of driving, where upon they have the option of leaving or exploring different departments to work for. Like the full-timers, students select shifts before the Spring and Fall semesters only, which are their weekly permanent shifts. Unlike full-time staff, students have more flexibility in choosing individual shifts rather than packages.

Maintenance
Maintenance is overseen by the Fleet Maintenance Manager, who operates through numerous full-time field managers. These on-site managers are in charge of coordinating service to all vehicles in the fleet for Shuttle–UM and Campus Parking Enforcement, which both make up DOTS. Service done to these vehicles include but are not limited to preventative maintenance, DOT inspections, and fixing mechanical problems. Maintenance operates out of multiple bays located in the Paint Branch facility, which facilitates their work due to the facility also housing parking for all vehicles.

Training
The training department consists of certified CDL full-time instructors that are responsible for coordinate training to drivers, students and full-timers, who which to seek employment with Shuttle–UM and obtaining a CDL license. Training consists of multiple sessions that gives drivers numerous hours of training through range and road exercises in order to prepare them for CDL exams administered at the Motor Vehicle Administration (MVA). Upon their CDL completion, training is also responsible for giving orientations of all Shuttle–UM commercial vehicles in order to give all drivers and equal opportunity in driving routes that require different vehicles.

Dispatch
The dispatch department is responsible for transit operations in regards to all services provided by the company, including demand response and fixed routes. All dispatchers are students, who are trained to operate the technology and equipment necessary to ensure service is operative. The dispatchers report directly to the shift supervisors upon problems arising before executing decisions that will ensure service being completed. Dispatch also coordinates all customer service inquires regarding routes, demand response, charter, staff, and campus guests. The Shuttle–UM dispatch department operates in sync with the University of Maryland Police Department (UMPD), due to the organization being a state-governed agency: this connection with UMPD provides a branch of safety to drivers and to passengers upon distress signals and accident response. As a result, Shuttle–UM dispatch uses certain police 10-codes for daily operations. Aside from dealing with transit operations, the dispatchers are responsible for recording ridership tallies that are radio communicated to them by drivers upon the completion of every run of every route, which in turn gives the organization passenger data to work with in operations.

Routes 

Beginning with simply two routes in 1972, the company has expanded its bus service by currently having 27 routes (23 that serve UMD, 3 that serve UMB, and 1 that serves BSU). Since its existence, the company has added and dropped several of its routes. These known documented instances are noted below. For Example, the "Adelphi South" route, which was one of Shuttle UM's very first routes created around 1975/1976, was discontinued during the summer of 2005. The "Adelphi South" route operated between the University of Maryland College Park Campus and Langley Park, MD, via Campus Drive, University Boulevard East (MD 193), Riggs Road (MD 212), the Isabella Gardens Apartment Complex, the University Gardens Apartment Complex, the Marylander Apartments/Serene Townhomes, Keokee Street, Merrimac Drive, 14th Avenue, Quebec Street, Ruatan Street, 11th Avenue, Carroll Avenue, University Boulevard East (MD 193), and Campus Drive.  Also, the "Queens Chapel" route, which was also another one of Shuttle UM's very first routes, created around 1975/1976, was discontinued on August 25, 2006 (the start of the 2006–2007 school year). The "Queens Chapel" Route operated back and forth between the University of Maryland College Park Campus and Hyattsville, MD, via Campus Drive, Adelphi Road, Toledo Road, the Prince George's Plaza Shopping Center, Toledo Terrace, East - West Highway (MD 410), 23rd Avenue, Ager Road, Nicholson Street, the Kirkwood Apartment Complex, Kirkwood Place, Ager Road, the West Hyattsville Metro Station (after the station opened on December 11, 1993), Hamilton Street, Queens Chapel Road (MD 500), Oglethorpe Street, 42nd Avenue, Queensbury Road, Baltimore Avenue (U.S. Route 1), Regents Drive, and Campus Drive. On August 25, 2006, the route was discontinued and replaced by the, "113 University Town Center" Route, which would only operate between the University of Maryland College Park Campus and Prince George's Plaza Metro Station, serving the University Town Center Student Housing Complex, which just opened across the Prince George's Plaza Metro Station during the previous month. Eventually, in 2012, the route was renamed as, "113 Hyattsville", since it was extended to Downtown Hyattsville in order to serve the brand new Hyattsville Arts District Apartments. In August, 2009, Shuttle–UM ceased the operation of its 101 Route One Corridor route due to low ridership and very high redundancy to the already existing 81 & 83 Metrobus Routes, which already operate on the U.S. Route 1 corridor. Certain stops that the community rallied to be served were added onto the 110 Seven Springs Apartments route to compensate. At the conclusion of the 2007–2008 academic year, the 102 Campus Connector North and 103 Campus Connector South were discontinued in favor of the 125 Campus Circulator. The campus "connector" routes were the only routes that ran through campus before the start of the evening routes. For undisclosed reasons, the routes were merged into one route that saw the continuation of service through the same areas and regions of campus that were originally served.

At the conclusion of the 2011–12 academic year, the city of Greenbelt saw a reduction in service by Shuttle–UM. The 101 Beltway Plaza served the Beltway Plaza shopping mall by providing students a shopping outlet on the weekends. Route initially operated as "Springhill Lake" but was renamed as "Beltway Plaza/Springhill Lake" in August, 2005 when the route was extended from Springhill Lake Apartments to the Beltway Plaza. In August, 2006, during the time all Shuttle UM route names were assigned actual three digit route numbers,  the "Beltway Plaza/Springhill Lake" became known as "101 Beltway Plaza/Springhill Lake". However; in August, 2007 at the request of the Springhill Lake Apartment management due to renovations taking place with the apartments, the route stopped serving the Springhill Lake Apartments and was rerouted to only serve Beltway Plaza. As a result, the route was renamed as, "101 Beltway Plaza". The route was last served during 2011-2012 and quietly terminated at the start of 2012–13.  Additionally, the 131 Mazza Grandmarc/Enclave Franklin Park no longer ran to the Franklin Park complex in Greenbelt after 2011–12. The creation of the 130 Greenbelt and expanded service to the 129 Franklin Park at Greenbelt Station for the 2011–12 academic year saw the merger of the 106 Greenbelt North and 119 Greenbelt South routes, which last ran at the conclusion of 2010–11. The " 106 Greenbelt North" Route was split into two separate routes, the "106 Greenbelt North" route and the "119 Greenbelt South" route around 2008. While the "106 Greenbelt North" route would operate through Old Greenbelt, the new "119 Greenbelt South" route replaced the portion of the Shuttle UM "Greenbelt North" route on Greenbelt Road (MD 193) (east of the intersection of Southway by the Greenway Shopping Center), Hanover Parkway, Greenbrook Drive, Ora Glen Drive, Mandan Road, Westchester Park Drive/Circle, Kenilworth Avenue (MD 201), and Paint Branch Parkway  Additional routes that saw changes included the 123 M-Square which was cancelled between 2010–11 and 2012–13, which saw its services expanded onto the 109 River Road; the 108 Powder Mill Village route renamed as "108 Adelphi" in 2012. Shuttle UM's "Powder Mill Village" route was initially introduced in August, 2004 and operated via Campus Drive, Adelphi Road, Riggs Road/Powder Mill Road (MD 212), the Powder Mill Village Apartments, Powder Mill Road (MD 212), Cherry Hill Road, the Seven Springs Village Apartment Complex, Cherry Hill Road, Baltimore Avenue (U.S. Route 1), Edgewood Road, Rhode Island Avenue, Greenbelt Road, Baltimore Avenue (U.S. Route 1), and Campus Drive. The Shuttle UM Powder amill Village not only provided brand new Shuttle UM bus service to the Powder Mill Village Apartment Complex on Powder Mill Road (MD 212) in Beltsville, MD, but also replaced the former Shuttle UM "Rhode Island Avenue" route between the Seven Springs Village Apartments and University of Maryland College Park Campus Adele H. Stamp Student Union, which was discontinued in May, 2004. However; the Shuttle UM Powder Mill Village route was renamed as "108 Powder Mill Village" in August, 2006 and rerouted to divert off Adelphi Road onto University Boukevard East (MD 193) and operate up to the intersection of New Hampshire Avenue (MD 650), via Metzerott Road, and then join Powder Mill Road (MD 212) via New Hampshire Avenue (MD 650) and Powder Mill Road, instead of joining the intersection of Powder Mill Road (MD 212), via its original routing via Adelphi Road & Riggs Road (MD 212), in order to completely replace the former Shuttle UM "Adelphi North" route that was discontinued at the time. However; Shuttle UM's Powder Mill Village route was rerouted to operate back from the Powder Mill Village Apartments towards the University of Maryland College Park Campus, via Powder Mill Road (MD 212), Powder Mill Road, New Hampshire Avenue (MD 650), Metzerott Road, Paint Branch Drive, and Regents Drive instead of operating via Cherry Hill Road, Seven Springs Village Apartments, Cherry Hill Road, Baltimore Avenue (U.S. Route 1), Edgewood Road, Rhode Island Avenue, Greenbelt Road, Baltimore Avenue (U.S. Route 1), and Campus Drive. The former segment of the Shuttle UM Powder Mill Village route's routing was replaced by Shuttle UM's brand new "107 Seven Springs Village" route in August, 2006. The Shuttle UM Powder Mill Village route was eventually truncated to only operate between the University of Maryland College Park Campus and intersection of Powder Mill Road & New Hampshire Avenue (MD 650) in August, 2010 due to the request by the management of the Powder Mill Village Apartment Complex to no longer serve the complex. However; two years later, the route was truncated even further to only operate up to the former "Adelphi North" terminus inside the Chateau at Avery Apartment Complex on Oakview Drive in the far northeast Silver Spring (south of the I-495/I-95 interchange bordering Adelphi)  and as a result, was officially renamed as, "108 Adelphi" in 2012.
The 2012-13 year saw the cancellation of the company's "park and ride" services: 101 Burtonsville Park and Ride, 107 Laurel Park and Ride, and 120 Bowie Park and Ride. As Shuttle–UM's first aim to promote sustainability by providing service to regions further than the surrounding campus, the routes servicing Burtonsville, Bowie, and Laurel saw a decline in ridership. Riders protested its cancellation; however, on October 12, the routes were serviced for the final time while DOTS provided alternatives for the riders in reaching campus. Additionally to the decline in riders, the 124 The Universities at Shady Grove route required more buses and funds to maintain, thus the park and rides fate was determined by a budget cut necessary to maintain the 124.

With the expansion of Shuttle–UM into Baltimore at the UMB campus, three routes began to service the area in 2012–13 with 701 BioPark, 702 Mount Vernon, and 703 Federal Hill servicing the immediate UMB campus seven days a week.

Current
The Shuttle–UM transit system operates primarily circuit routes that start and end on the UMCP campus. As of January 2022, there are 19 routes operated by Shuttle-UM, two of which are operated by a subcontractor. The system's bus routes utilize three bus terminals: Adele H. Stamp Student Union, Regents Drive Parking Garage, and the College Park–University of Maryland station. 

University of Maryland, College Park
{| class="wikitable collapsible collapsed" style="font-size: 90%;" |
! Route
!colspan=3|Terminals
! Major streets traveled
! Service notes
|-
|rowspan=3 style="background:white; color:black" align="center" valign=top|104 College Park Metro Station
|-
|colspan=5 style="background:red; color:white" align="left"|Commuter service
|-
|Regents Drive Garage
! ↔
|College Park-UMD StationCamden Line
|
 Outbound: Paint Branch Parkway, River Road
 Inbound: River Road, Paint Branch Parkway
|
Operates Sunday-Thursday, with extended overnight hours Friday-Saturday.
|-
|rowspan=3 style="background:white; color:black" align="center" valign=top|105 The Courtyards
|-
|colspan=5 style="background:red; color:white" align="left"|Commuter service
|-
|Regents Drive Garage
! ↔
|The Courtyards at UMD ApartmentsBuilding #500
|
 Outbound: Metzerott Road, Greenmeade Drive, Boteler Lane
 Inbound: Boteler Lane, Greenmeade Drive, Metzerott Road
|
Operates Monday-Friday in the daytime; evening and overnight service provided by the 116 (see below).
Summer semester service provided by the 135 (see below).
|-
|rowspan=3 style="background:white; color:black" align="center" valign=top|108 Adelphi
|-
|colspan=5 style="background:red; color:white" align="left"|Commuter service
|-
|Adele H. Stamp Student UnionSlip at Campus Drive
! ↔
|AdelphiThe Chateau Apartments at Mount Pisgah Road
|
 Outbound: Metzerott Road, New Hampshire Avenue
 Inbound: New Hampshire Avenue, Metzerott Road
|
Operates Monday-Friday; no overnight service provided
|-
|rowspan=3 style="background:white; color:black" align="center" valign=top|109 River Road
|-
|colspan=5 style="background:black; color:white" align="left"|Special service
|-
|College Park-UMD StationCamden Line
! ↔
|M-Square Research Park
|
 Outbound: River Road
 Inbound: River Road
|
Operates Monday-Friday, only in the morning and afternoon rush hours
This route services federal government buildings on River Road and operates according to the federal government schedule
|-
|rowspan=3 style="background:white; color:black" align="center" valign=top|110 Seven Springs Apartments
|-
|colspan=5 style="background:red; color:white" align="left"|Commuter service
|-
|Adele H. Stamp Student UnionSlip at Campus Drive
! ↔
|Seven Springs Apartments
|
 Outbound: University Boulevard, Rhode Island Avenue, Baltimore Avenue...
 Inbound: Baltimore Avenue, Rhode Island Avenue, University Boulevard...
|
Operates Monday-Friday.
Summer semester service provided by the 134 (see below).
|-
|rowspan=3 style="background:white; color:black" align="center" valign=top|111 Silver Spring
|-
|colspan=5 style="background:red; color:white" align="left"|Commuter service
|-
|Adele H. Stamp Student UnionLot HH at Campus Drive
! ↔
|
Silver Spring
Takoma Park
Silver Spring Metro Station
|
 Outbound: University Boulevard, Carroll Avenue, Flower Avenue...
 Inbound: Wayne Avenue, Flower Avenue, Carroll Avenue...
|
 Operates Monday-Friday.
 Rerouted to Takoma Langley Transit Center on December 31, 2016
|-
|rowspan=3 style="background:white; color:black" align="center" valign=top|113 Hyattsville
|-
|colspan=5 style="background:red; color:white" align="left"|Commuter service
|-
|Adele H. Stamp Student UnionSlip at Campus Drive
! ↔
|
Hyattsville
Prince George's Plaza Metro Station
|
 Outbound: Adelphi Road, Belcrest Road, Queensbury Road,...
 Inbound: Baltimore Avenue, Queensbury Road, Belcrest Road,...
|
Operates Monday-Friday; weekend service to Hyattsville provided by the 133 (see below).
|-
|rowspan=3 style="background:white; color:black" align="center" valign=top|114 University View
|-
|colspan=5 style="background:red; color:white" align="left"|Commuter service
|-
|Adele H. Stamp Student UnionLot HH at Campus Drive
! ↔
|University View Apartments
|
 Outbound: Campus Drive, Knox Road, Baltimore Avenue
 Inbound: Baltimore Avenue
|
Operates Monday-Friday daytime; evening and weekend service provided by the 117 (see below) .
|-
|rowspan=3 style="background:white; color:black" align="center" valign=top|115 Orange
|-
|colspan=5 style="background:purple; color:white" align="left"|Evening service
|-
|Adele H. Stamp Student UnionSlip at Campus Drive
! ↔
|
North Campus
Downtown College park
|
 Loop: Campus Drive, Regents Drive, Baltimore Avenue
|
Operates Sunday-Saturday, with extended overnight hours provided Friday-Saturday.
|-
|rowspan=3 style="background:white; color:black" align="center" valign=top|116 Purple
|-
|colspan=5 style="background:purple; color:white" align="left"|Evening service
|-
|Adele H. Stamp Student UnionLot HH at Campus Drive
! ↔
|
The Courtyards at UMD Apartments
Downtown College Park
|
 Loop: Campus Drive, Regents Drive, University Boulevard, Metzerott Road,...
|
Operates Sunday-Saturday, with extended overnight hours provided Friday-Saturday.
|-
|rowspan=3 style="background:white; color:black" align="center" valign=top|117 Blue
|-
|colspan=5 style="background:purple; color:white" align="left"|Evening service
|-
|Adele H. Stamp Student UnionLot HH at Campus Drive
! ↔
|
Downtown College Park
Uptown College Park
|
 Loop: Campus Drive, Mowatt Lane, Knox Road, Baltimore Avenue,...
|
Operates Sunday-Saturday, with extended service hours Friday-Saturday.
|-
|rowspan=3 style="background:white; color:black" align="center" valign=top|118 Gold
|-
|colspan=5 style="background:purple; color:white" align="left"|Evening service
|-
|Adele H. Stamp Student UnionSlip at Campus Drive
! ↔
|
South Campus
North Campus
Graduate Housing
Downtown College Park
|
 Loop: Campus Drive, Preinkert Drive, University Boulevard,...
|
Operates Sunday-Saturday, with extended overnight hours Friday-Saturday.
|-
|rowspan=3 style="background:white; color:black" align="center" valign=top|122 Green
|-
|colspan=5 style="background:purple; color:white" align="left"|Evening service
|-
|Adele H. Stamp Student UnionSlip at Campus Drive
! ↔
|
South Campus
Graham Cracker (Sorority Housing)
Fraternity Row
Downtown College Park
North Campus
|
 Loop: Campus Drive, Preinkert Drive, Knox Road,...
|
Operates Sunday-Saturday, with extended overnight hours Friday-Saturday.
|-
|rowspan=3 style="background:white; color:black" align="center" valign=top|124 The Universities at Shady Grove
|-
|colspan=5 style="background:red; color:white" align="left"|Commuter Service
|-
|Adele H. Stamp Student UnionSlip at Campus Drive
! ↔
|
The Universities at Shady Grove
|
 Outbound: Campus Drive, New Hampshire Avenue, Interstate 95,...
 Outbound: Interstate 95, Baltimore Avenue, Campus Drive,...
|
Operates Monday-Friday as an express bus service.
|-
|rowspan=3 style="background:white; color:black" align="center" valign=top|125 Circulator
|-
|colspan=5 style="background:red; color:white" align="left"|Commuter Service
|-
|Adele H. Stamp Student UnionSlip at Campus Drive
! ↔
|
Graduate Housing
Downtown College Park
Uptown College Park
Xfinity Center
|
 Loop: Campus Drive, Guildford Drive, Baltimore Avenue,...
|
Operates Monday-Friday.
Summer service is provided by the 135 (see below).
|-
|rowspan=3 style="background:white; color:black" align="center" valign=top|126 New Carrollton
|-
|colspan=5 style="background:red; color:white" align="left"|Commuter Service
|-
|Adele H. Stamp Student UnionSlip at Campus Drive
! ↔
|
New Carrollton
New Carrollton StationPenn Line
|
 Outbound: Campus Drive, Baltimore Avenue, Maryland Route 410,...
 Inbound: Maryland Route 410, Baltimore Avenue, Campus Drive,...
|
Operates Monday-Friday.
|-
|rowspan=3 style="background:white; color:black" align="center" valign=top|127 Mazza GrandMarc
|-
|colspan=5 style="background:red; color:white" align="left"|Commuter Service
|-
|Regents Drive Garage
! ↔
|Mazza GrandMarc Apartments
|
 Outbound: Baltimore Avenue, Paint Branch Drive,...
 Inbound: Paint Branch Drive, Baltimore Avenue,...
|
Operates Monday-Friday; extended evening service hours provided by the 131 (see below) Thursday-Saturday only.
Summer service provided by the 134 (see below)|-
|rowspan=3 style="background:white; color:black" align="center" valign=top|128 The Enclave
|-
|colspan=5 style="background:red; color:white" align="left"|Commuter Service
|-
|Adele H. Stamp Student UnionSlip at Campus Drive
! ↔
|The Enclave Apartments
|
 Outbound: Campus Drive, University Boulevard,...
 Inbound: Baltimore Avenue, Paint Branch Drive...
|
Operates Monday-Friday; extended evening service hours provided by the 131 (see below) Thursday-Saturday only.
|-
|rowspan=3 style="background:white; color:black" align="center" valign=top|129 Franklin Park at Greenbelt Station
|-
|colspan=5 style="background:red; color:white" align="left"|Commuter Service
|-
|Regents Drive Garage
! ↔
|
Franklin Park Apartments at Greenbelt Station
Greenbelt StationCamden Line
|
 Outbound: Paint Branch Parkway, Kenilworth Avenue, Edmonston Road...
 Inbound: Cherrywood Lane, Pontiact Street, Edmonston Road...
|
Operates Monday-Friday.
|-
|rowspan=3 style="background:white; color:black" align="center" valign=top|130 Greenbelt
|-
|colspan=5 style="background:red; color:white" align="left"|Commuter Service
|-
|Adele H. Stamp Student UnionCampus Drive at Slip
! ↔
|
Greenbelt
NASA Goddard Space Flight Center
|
 Outbound: Greenbelt Road
 Inbound: Ridge Road, Kenilworth Avenue...
|
Operates Monday-Friday, year-long.
|-
|rowspan=3 style="background:white; color:black" align="center" valign=top|131 The Enclave and Mazza GrandMarc
|-
|colspan=5 style="background:purple; color:white" align="left"|Evening Service
|-
|Adele H. Stamp Student UnionCampus Drive at Lot HH
! ↔
|
Downtown College Park
Mazza GrandMarc Apartments
The Enclave Apartments
|
 Outbound: Baltimore Avenue
 Inbound: Baltimore Avenue
|
Operates Thursday-Saturday.
This is the only evening service route that requires proper university identification to board.
|-
|rowspan=3 style="background:white; color:black" align="center" valign=top|132 The Varsity
|-
|colspan=5 style="background:red; color:white" align="left"|Commuter service
|-
|Adele H. Stamp Student UnionLot HH at Campus Drive
! ↔
|The Varsity Apartments
|
 Outbound: Campus Drive, Knox Road, Baltimore Avenue
 Inbound: Baltimore Avenue, Campus Drive
|
Operates Monday-Friday daytime; evening and weekend service provided by the 117 (see below).
|-
|rowspan=3 style="background:white; color:black" align="center" valign=top|133 The Mall at Prince George's
|-
|colspan=5 style="background:navy; color:white" align="left"|Weekend service
|-
|Adele H. Stamp Student UnionSlip at Campus Drive
! ↔
|
The Mall at Prince George's
Prince George's Plaza Metro Station
|
 Outbound: Baltimore Avenue, Adelphi Road, Belcrest Road...
 Inbound: Belcrest Road, Adelphi Road, Baltimore Avenue...
|
Operates only on Saturdays.
Offers limited weekend service to areas serviced by the '''113 (see above).
Replaced the 101 (see below), as the weekend shopping mall service route.
|-
|rowspan=3 style="background:white; color:black" align="center" valign=top|134 Mazza GrandMarc and Seven Springs Apartments
|-
|colspan=5 style="background:red; color:white" align="left"|Commuter service|-
|Regents Drive Garage! ↔
|Seven Springs ApartmentsMazza GrandMarc Apartments|
 Outbound: Campus Drive, Baltimore Avenue, Rhode Island Avenue...
 Inbound: Baltimore Avenue, Paint Branch Drive, Stadium Drive
|
Operates Monday-Friday.
Offers service through a combination of the 110 and 127 (see above).
|-
|rowspan=3 style="background:white; color:black" align="center" valign=top|135 University Connector
|-
|colspan=5 style="background:red; color:white" align="left"|Commuter Service|-
|Regents Drive Garage! ↔
|Graduate HousingDowntown College ParkUptown College ParkThe Courtyards at UMD Apartments|
 Loop: Campus Drive, Baltimore Avenue, Guilford Drive ...
|
Operates Monday-Friday.
Offers service through a combination of the 105 and 125 (see above).
|-
|rowspan=3 style="background:white; color:black" align="center" valign=top|136 Indigo
|-
|colspan=5 style="background:purple; color:white" align="left"|Evening service|-
|Adele H. Stamp Student UnionCampus Drive at Lot HH
! ↔
|The Courtyards at UMDGraduate HousingDowntown College ParkUptown College Park|
 Loop:''' Regents Drive, University Boulevard, Guilford Drive...
|
Operates Sunday-Saturday.
This is the only route in service during the summer semester.
|-
|}

Former
From 2012 until 2019, Shuttle-UM provided satellite service to the University of Maryland, Baltimore and the University of Baltimore campuses.

University of Maryland, Baltimore

University of Baltimore

Former
There are 12 documented routes that have been cancelled, or altered. 

 Seasonal routes 

Scheduled bus service is also available for academic semester breaks from Stamp Student Union to areas outside of Maryland.

Transportation to Metropark in New Jersey allows access to Amtrak and New Jersey Transit routes.  Bus service to the Port Authority Bus Terminal provides indirect access to JFK, LaGuardia and other transit options in New York City.

Shuttle–UM also has seasonal routes to the Cherry Hill Mall in Cherry Hill, NJ and Philadelphia.

FleetShuttle-UM owns over 70 vehicles used to fulfill its service. They range from a variety of builders, models, length, and engine transmission. The company numbers its series according to the year the vehicle was registered to begin service. For example, vehicle 3813 is a 2013 Gillig Low Floor bus, but was not placed in service until 2013. Thus, the 13 is added to the final two digits of Shuttle-UM's'' series numbering. The vehicles are also grouped in several categories: PHG (Gillig Phantom), LFG (Gillig Low Floor), FFG ( Gillig Low Floor Bus), FTL (Freightliner Champion Defender), Vans (Ford E-450, Ford E-350, Dodge Sprinter, Chevrolet Express), and Motor Coach (Setra S417).

References

General

Specific

External links 
Department of Transportation Services at University of Maryland, College Park
Shuttle-UM
UM Shuttle
 
  
  
  
  
  
Shuttle-UM records, University of Maryland libraries

University of Maryland, College Park
College Park, Maryland
Bus transportation in Maryland
Transportation in Prince George's County, Maryland
University and college bus systems
1972 establishments in Maryland